Hope Gardens may refer to:
 A housing block in Bushwick, Brooklyn
 Hope Botanical Gardens, Kingston, Jamaica